Springdale is a rural locality in the Southern Downs Region, Queensland, Australia.

History 
The Queensland Government operated the State Arsenic Mine (also called the Jibbinbar Mine) from 1919 to 1924. The motivation for establishing the mine was to obtain arsenic was to poison prickly pear which was a highly invasive plant species in Queensland at that time. However, the prickly pear was eventually biologically controlled by the introduction of the Cactoblastis cactorum moth, removing the need for large supplies of arsenic, so the mine closed.

Jibbenbah State School opened on 22 June 1922 for the use of mining families and local farming families. It closed on 27 January 1925.

References 

Southern Downs Region
Localities in Queensland